openCanvas is a raster graphics software developed and published by PGN Corp. It was originally released as freeware in 2000, but moved to a shareware model starting with version 2. All functions are available during the limited demo period.
A higher performance version "openCanvas Plus" has been released simultaneously since version 3.
Its functions are similar to Adobe Photoshop or Corel Painter.

In 2009, portalgraphics.net ended the sales of the openCanvas English versions. At the same time, they ended the English version of the portalgraphics website and their online English Customer Services including PGN User Community. English Customer Support was to be discontinued on July 31, 2010. However, the English portalgraphics website went active again shortly afterwards, and portalgraphics has continued sales of openCanvas series to the present.

"openCanvas 5.5.18" was released on July 26, 2013 in Japanese and English. On July 3, 2014, "openCanvas 6.0.00" was released with 64-bit support.

System requirements

openCanvas 4.5/ 4.5 Plus
openCanvas 4.5/ 4.5 Plus was released on April 5, 2007.

Windows
 OS: WindowsMe / 2000 / XP (Neither Windows 98 nor 95 are supported. openCanvas 4.5/ 4.5 Plus does not support Windows Vista formally.)
HDD: More than 10MB free capacity
CPU: More than Intel Pentium 500 MHz
RAM: 128 MB
Resolution: More than 1024 × 768 pixel
Color depth: More than 32 bit(16,770,000 colors)
Peripherals: Wacom tablet, XP-pen

openCanvas 5.05
openCanvas 5.05 was released on April 4, 2011.

Windows
OS: Windows XP / Vista / 7
HDD: More than 10MB free capacity
CPU: x86 Compatible Processor corresponding to SSE2
RAM: Recommended Memory Capacity by Operating System
Resolution: More than 1024 × 768 pixel
Color depth: More than 32 bit(16,770,000 colors)
Peripherals: Wacom tablet

openCanvas 5.5
openCanvas 5.5 was released on July 2, 2012.

Windows
OS: Windows XP / Vista / 7
HDD: More than 10MB free capacity
CPU: x86 Compatible Processor corresponding to SSE2
RAM: Recommended Memory Capacity by Operating System
Resolution: More than 1024 × 768 pixel
Color depth: More than 32 bit(16,770,000 colors)
Peripherals: Wacom tablet

openCanvas 6.0
openCanvas 6.0 was released on August 29, 2014.

Windows
OS: Windows Vista / 7 / 8 / 8.1 / 10
HDD: More than 10MB free capacity
CPU: x86 Compatible Processor corresponding to SSE2
RAM: Recommended 4Gb or more (32-bit) / 8Gb or more (64-bit)
Resolution: More than 1024 × 768 pixel
Color depth: More than 32 bit(16,770,000 colors)
Peripherals: Wacom tablet / Tablet PCs compatible to TabletPC API

openCanvas 7.0
openCanvas 7.0 was released on September 21, 2017

Windows

OS: Windows 7 or newer
HDD: More than 10MB free capacity
CPU: x86 Compatible Processor corresponding to SSE2
RAM: 500 MB RAM
Resolution: 1280x768 / True Color
Color depth: More than 32 bit(16,770,000 colors)
Peripherals: Wacom tablet / Tablet PCs compatible to TabletPC API

See also
List of raster graphics editors
Comparison of raster graphics editors

References

External links
Portalgraphics Web site, English
Portalgraphics Web site, Japanese
PGN User Community
warPaint - Java based openCanvas Server Emulator
N-SoCS - another openCanvas Server Emulator
oC 1.1 free edition, includes network capability removed from retail

Raster graphics editors
2000 software